The Argyle Building in Kansas City, Missouri was built in 1906.  It was designed as a 4-story structure by architect Louis Curtiss in Early Commercial style.  In 1924–1925, the firm of Keene & Simpson expanded the building to 10 stories. The new floors were used for medical offices. It was listed on the U.S. National Register of Historic Places in 2005.

References

Commercial buildings on the National Register of Historic Places in Missouri
Buildings designated early commercial in the National Register of Historic Places
Commercial buildings completed in 1906
Buildings and structures in Kansas City, Missouri
National Register of Historic Places in Kansas City, Missouri
1906 establishments in Missouri